Trepaxonemata (from trepa-, spiral + axoneme) is a subclass of the Platyhelminthes or flatworms. It includes all parasitic flatworms (clade Neodermata) and several free-living species that were previously grouped in the now obsolete class Turbellaria. Therefore, it contains the majority of species in the phylum Platyhelminthes, excluding the Catenulida, and the Macrostomorpha.

Description

The Trepaxonemata are characterised by:
 biflagellate spermatozoa
 axoneme of the spermatozoa with a special type of dense core (9+“1” pattern).
The axoneme in the spermatozoa of species of Trepaxonemata, also called "trepaxoneme" or "trepaxonematan axoneme" has nine peripheral doublets of microtubules as the usual 9+2 axoneme but the two central microtubules are replaced by a central core. This central core appears as a spiral when seen in longitudinal sections in transmission electron microscopy.

This structure is found in all species of Trepaxonemata with very rare exceptions. The trepaxoneme is found only in the Platyhelminthes; no other phylum has this 9+“1” structure. However, the cilia in cells other than spermatozoa in species of Trepaxonemata have the classical 9+2 structure, for example in the epidermis of in protonephridia.

The Trepaxonemata is one of the rare examples of major groups in zoology named after characteristics of spermatozoa, and especially after characteristics observed with transmission electron microscopy.

Systematics

Current classification of Trepaxonemata based on several morphological and molecular studies:

Subclass Trepaxonemata
Clade Amplimatricata
Order Lecithoepitheliata
Order Polycladida
Clade Euneoophora
Order Rhabdocoela
Order Proseriata
Clade Acentrosomata
Clade Adiaphanida
Order Prolecithophora
Order Fecampiida
Order Tricladida
Clade Bothrioneodermata
Order Bothrioplanida
Clade Neodermata
Order Trematoda
Order Monogenea
Order Cestoda

References

Further reading